is a vertically scrolling shooter arcade game series developed by Success Corporation on Taito's G-NET hardware.

Psyvariar: Medium Unit

Control
 Rolling: Rapidly moving the joystick in opposite directions. Rolling briefly increases moving speed.
 Rolling shot: Press fire button when rolling. In this firing mode, the fighter fires in concentrated forward formation for a brief moment.

Fighters

Player's fighter has a hit box of 1x1 pixel at the centre of fighter.

In the beginning of a game, player's fighter is AXION 001. A fighter can gain levels by buzzing of destroying enemy units or buzzing. Once the fighter gains sufficient level, it changes form and its firing patterns are altered. Fighter's level is maintained between stages, lives, and credits.

Stages
There a 6 stages in each game. After completing Stage 1 (Area 1), player can choose the area within the higher numbered stage to be completed. More difficult (and higher-scoring) areas become selectable only if the fighter's level reaches the requirement before choosing next stage.

If a stage is completed with only 1 credit, the high score for that area is saved in the game hardware's non-volatile memory, providing the score for that area is higher than previous record.

Buzz system
Each time an enemy unit or bullet gets very close to player's fighter without destroying player's fighter, a "buzz" occurs. For each buzz, the fighter gains experience (indicated by meter at the top of the screen). When the fighter gains sufficient experience, its level increases, and it becomes temporarily invulnerable. During that period, fighter can inflict damages to enemy units by colliding. Player can use this short period to risk buzzing more bullets to quickly reach the next level, or to avoid particularly difficult bullet patterns. The collision area for trigger buzz to occur is a circular area surrounding fighter's hit box, covering the fighter's body.

When buzzing causes the fighter to transform, the damage to nearby enemy units increase. If a fighter is rolling, the buzz radius increases, fighter's hit box is reduced, and the buzz collision detection is only done once every 2 frames.

Psyvariar Revision

The game is an update to Psyvariar: Medium Unit. There are following changes:
 Added replay function, and an associated replay mode.
 Rearranged stages. Enemies fire denser and faster bullet patterns, especially bosses.
 Player-controllable fighters' graphics and firing patterns were changed.
 In boss battles, a life gauge is shown.
 A bullet can now be buzzed as many times as possible, which allows much higher scores and levels.
 Rolling can be performed by holding bomb button when the bomb stock is empty.
 Added Internet ranking (closed as of 31 March 2001).

Normal mode
At the end of each stage, the game shows following statistics:
 Destruction rate: The percentage of enemy units destroyed using current credit. If the value is 100, player gains 1 bomb.
 Destruction bonus: Player gains 10000 points for every percentage.
 Max BUZZ chain: The maximum amount of buzz obtained with current credit in the completed stage, compared to buzz obtained with all the lives spent in the stage.
 Total BUZZ: Total amount of buzz obtained with current credit in the completed stage.
 BUZZ bonus: Player gains 500 points for every buzz in Max BUZZ chain and Total BUZZ fields.
 Stage total: Total bonus points player gained in the completed stage.

Replay mode
It allows player to choose a stage for which a high score is available. Player can watch a replay for the chosen stage before playing. Player can choose up to 5 areas per game. When player starts a stage, player has the same number of fighters as the one in the replay stage. Unlike Normal mode, if player loses all lives in a stage, the game cannot be continued.

Fighters

Stages
In Normal mode, there are 4-8 stages in each game, depending on the fighter's level. In addition to the branching system in Psyvariar -Medium Unit-, After completing area 2, 3, or 4 stage with very high fighter level, the next stage becomes a danger stage (Area X), where the type of X-area depends on fighter's level. An X-area can only be played 1 time per game, with easier X-area played first. After completing an X-area stage, the next selectable stage is a higher numbered area (if one remains). If the 3rd X-area stage (stage 7) is completed with sufficient fighter level, the next stage is Area X-D. If a sufficiently high fighter level is not achieved the game will end after stage X-B.

If a stage is completed with only 1 credit, not only the high score of the area is saved, but also the replay for that area, providing the score for that area is higher than previous record. Once a replay for that area is saved, it becomes available in Replay mode.

In replay mode, there are following extra stages:
 Area XXA (Photon-X)
 Area XXB (Graviton-X)
 Area XXC (Weakboson-X)
 Area XXD (Gluon-X)

Area XX stage can only be played by completing Area X-D in replay mode. Once X-D has been completed, all Area XX stages become selectable. The Area XX stages are similar in design to their Area X counterparts but they have an increased number of enemies that fire denser bullet patterns.

SoftBank, DoComo, au versions
It includes only 11 areas, but internet ranking is integrated into the phone service. Replays can be transferred between players.

Psyvariar: Complete Edition

It is a compilation that contains both Psyvariar: Medium Unit and Psyvariar Revision.

New features include:
 Option to use a separate button to roll.
 Secret Lab Jukebox.
 Ability to display hit boxes.
 Ability to unlock new stages for Replay Mode after completing current higher areas (starting from Area 2-C, then Area 3-B onwards for remaining stages).
 Replay Mode is now available on both Psyvariar: Medium Unit and Psyvariar Revision, while in the Arcade version it is only available for Psyvariar Revision.

Two special editions were also available in Japan. The Special Sound Box included an audio CD of the game's soundtrack, and the Special Capture Box included a gameplay DVD of both games being fully completed by expert players. The PlayStation 2 versions of the individual games were later released separately as budget range titles.

The European version retained all the features of the Japanese release and includes a 60Hz mode.

Reception
On release, Famitsu magazine scored the game a 30 out of 40.

Soundtracks
PSYVARIAR "THE MIX" is a remixed soundtrack published by Egg Music Records.

See also
 Psyvariar 2

References

External links
Skonec page
Taito page

Medium Unit
Success Corp. page: arcade, PS2

Revision
Success Corp. page: arcade, PS2, SoftBank, DoCoMo, au

Complete Edition
Success Corp. page
Xplosiv page

Soundtrack
Egg Music PSYVARIAR "THE MIX" page

Arcade video games
Mobile games
PlayStation 2 games
PlayStation Network games
Success (company) games
Vertically scrolling shooters
Video games developed in Japan
Video game franchises
Video game franchises introduced in 2000

ja:サイヴァリア